VHP may refer to:

 Vaporized hydrogen peroxide
 Vassar Haiti Project, a nonprofit organization promoting Haitian art
 Veteran's Heritage Project
 Veterans History Project
 Volcano Hazards Program
 Vishva Hindu Parishad, an international Hindu organisation
 Progressive Reform Party (Suriname) (Vooruitstrevende Hervormingspartij), a political party in Suriname
 Civic Solidarity Party (Vətəndaş Həmrəyliyi Partiyası), a political party in Azerbaijan